Tom Pepper (born August 24, 1975 in Des Moines, Iowa) is a computer programmer best known for his collaboration with Justin Frankel on the Gnutella peer-to-peer system.  He and Frankel co-founded Nullsoft, whose most popular program is Winamp, which was sold to AOL in May 1999.  He subsequently worked for AOL developing SHOUTcast, an Internet streaming audio service, with Frankel and Stephen "Tag" Loomis. After leaving AOL in 2004. he worked at RAZZ, Inc. He continues to collaborate with Frankel on independent projects like Ninjam.

See also

 WASTE
 Friend-to-friend (F2F)
 File sharing
 Peer-to-peer (P2P)
 Gnutella
 Nullsoft
 Justin Frankel

References

Computer programmers
People from Des Moines, Iowa
Living people
1975 births
American chief technology officers
21st-century American businesspeople